Dense irregular connective tissue has fibers that are not arranged in parallel bundles as in dense regular connective tissue.

Dense irregular connective tissue consists of mostly collagen fibers. It has less ground substance than loose connective tissue. Fibroblasts are the predominant cell type, scattered sparsely across the tissue.

Function 

This type of connective tissue is found mostly in the reticular layer (or deep layer) of the dermis. It is also in the sclera and in the deeper skin layers. Due to high portions of collagenous fibers, dense irregular connective tissue provides strength, making the skin resistant to tearing by stretching forces from different directions.

Dense irregular connective tissue also makes up submucosa of the digestive tract, lymph nodes, and some types of fascia.  Other examples include periosteum and perichondrium of bones, and the tunica albuginea of testis. In the submucosa layer, the fiber bundles course in varying planes allowing the organ to resist excessive stretching and distension.

References

Tissues (biology)